Tatibahar railway station is a main railway station in Lakhimpur district, Assam. Its code is TBH. It serves Narayanpur town and nearby areas. The station consists of three platforms.

Major trains 

 Kamakhya–Murkongselek Lachit Express
 Rangapara North–Murkongselek Passenger
 Dekargaon–Murkongselek Passenger
 Naharlagun–Guwahati Donyi Polo Express
 Naharlagun−Guwahati Shatabdi Express
 Arunachal AC Superfast Express

References

Railway stations in Dhemaji district
Rangiya railway division